Dorothy Barr is a former Scottish international female lawn bowler.

Barr represented Scotland in the fours at the 1994 Commonwealth Games in Victoria, British Columbia, Canada and won a bronze medal with Betty Forsyth, Elizabeth Dickson and Janice Maxwell.

References

Living people
Scottish female bowls players
Commonwealth Games bronze medallists for Scotland
Bowls players at the 1994 Commonwealth Games
Commonwealth Games medallists in lawn bowls
Year of birth missing (living people)
Medallists at the 1994 Commonwealth Games